Au Pui Wan is a village in the Fo Tan area of Sha Tin District, Hong Kong. Is it located southeast of Grassy Hill.

Administration
Au Pui Wan is a recognized village under the New Territories Small House Policy. It is one of the villages represented within the Sha Tin Rural Committee. For electoral purposes, Au Pui Wan is part of the Fo Tan constituency, which is currently represented by Lui Kai-wing.

See also
 Kau Yeuk (Sha Tin)
 San Tin Village

References

External links
 Delineation of area of existing village Au Pui Wan (Sha Tin) for election of resident representative (2019 to 2022)

Sha Tin District

Villages in Sha Tin District, Hong Kong